Viveka (Sanskrit: विवेक, translit. Viveka) is a Sanskrit and Pali term translated into English as discernment or discrimination

Viveka, Viveca, or Vivica is a girl's name of Scandinavian origin meaning "alive, life, or place of refuge" and may also refer to:

People
Viveca Lindfors (1920–1995), Swedish stage and film actress, and singer
Viveca Novak, an American journalist who has worked as the editorial and communications director at OpenSecrets since 2011
Viveca Paulin (born 1969), Swedish actress and auctioneer
Viveca Serlachius (1923–1993), a Finnish-born Swedish actress
Viveca Sten (born 1959), Swedish novelist
Viveca Vázquez, Puerto Rican dancer
Viveka Babajee (1973–2010), Mauritian model and actress
Viveka Davis (born 1969), American film and television actress 
Viveka Eriksson or Viveca Eriksson (born 1956), a politician on the autonomous Åland Islands and the former Premier of Åland from 2007 to 2011.
Viveka (lyricist), Indian lyricist working on Tamil language films
Viveka Seldahl (1944–2001), Swedish actress
Vivica A. Fox (born 1964), American actress

Fictional characters
Viveca, a character in the 2009 computer-animated fantasy film Barbie and the Three Musketeers

See also
 Dṛg-Dṛśya-Viveka, an Advaita Vedanta text attributed to Bĥaratī Tīrtha or Vidyaranya Swami
 G. Vivekanand, Indian politician
 Swami Vivekananda (disambiguation)
 Vivekachudamani, an eighth-century Sanskrit poem in dialogue form that addresses the development of viveka
 Vivekanandan, an Indian name that is mostly used in South India
 Vivekanandan version, a modern version of Akilam, the main religious text of the Tamil belief system Ayyavazhi
 Vivek, a masculine given name

References

Scandinavian feminine given names